The M10 is a metropolitan route in the City of Cape Town Metropolitan Municipality, South Africa. It connects the town of Bellville in the Northern Suburbs with Philippi on the Cape Flats.

Route 
The M10 begins at a junction with the R102 (Voortrekker Road) in Bellville Central. It begins by heading southwards as Robert Sobukwe Drive through Bellville South to reach a junction with the M189, where it continues by a right turn (still named Robert Sobukwe Drive). The M10 continues south-west, bypassing Belhar, to reach a junction with the M12 (Stellenbosch Arterial). It continues south-west to meet the northern terminus of the M22, which provides an entrance to Cape Town International Airport.

From the M22 junction, the M10 continues west through the Nooitgedacht suburb to reach an interchange with the N2 Highway (Settlers Way), where it turns to the south. It passes through the Heideveld and Nyanga suburbs to reach its end at an interchange with the M7 Freeway (Jakes Gerwel Drive) in Philippi, just north of its Horticultural Area.

References 

Roads in Cape Town
Streets and roads of Cape Town
Metropolitan routes in Cape Town